Totally Hoops is a Disney Channel reality series. It tracked the experiences of eleven girls on the Dayton, Ohio Lady Hoopstars, a nationally acclaimed 14-and-under AAU basketball team, throughout the 2000s.

The Hoopstars
 5  – Maria Getty: 5'8" guard, age 13
 11 – Lauren Bahun: 5'8" guard, age 14
 12 – Shelby Georges: 5'7" guard, age 13,
 13 – Alisha Grusz: 5'9" forward, age 13
 20 – Michele DeVault: 5'10" center, age 14
 22 – Aisha Jefferson: 5'8" forward, age 13
 23 – Ashley Burtsfield: 5'8" guard, age 13
 24 – Kristen Shenk: 5'9" guard, age 14
 25 – Lindsey Goldsberry: 5'8" guard, age 13
 32 – Ashley Brown: 5'10" forward, age 13
 45 – Tiffany Williams: 7'0" center, age 13
 Coach: Steve Douglas

Episodes

References

External links
 

2000s American reality television series
2001 American television series debuts
2001 American television series endings
Basketball in Dayton, Ohio
Basketball television series
Disney Channel original programming
Culture of Dayton, Ohio
English-language television shows
Television series by Disney
Television series about teenagers
Television series by Evolution Film & Tape